Eileen Dreyer is an American author of contemporary romance, historical romance and suspense, and also publishes under the pen name Kathleen Korbel. She is a five-time winner of the Romance Writers of America RITA Award and in 1995 was inducted into the Romance Writers of America Hall of Fame. In 2014, she competed on the TV game show Jeopardy!.

Biography
Dreyer was born in St. Louis, Missouri and at the age of nineteen she began work as a trauma nurse.

She is trained in forensic nursing and death investigation and lives in Brentwood, Missouri with her husband and children. Her great-grandfather was a member of the IRA.

She published her first novel as Kathleen Korbel in 1986, writing for Harlequin's Silhouette category imprint. She said that "as a trauma nurse...she enjoyed writing romance because she liked to see good things happen to people, and scripting the story, she could be sure of that." Having grown up in a non-dysfunctional family, she said that working in the ER helped to show her the definition of a hero. "It constantly amazes me the people I've met who have had terrible things happen to them, but who live their lives well, loving and nurturing those around them. Those are my heroes. People who survive, who thrive, who triumph when there is no way they should."

Dreyer was a contestant on the October 30, 2014, episode of Jeopardy!, though she didn't win. She credited her ability to make it on the show and compete with reading a wide range of genres, but especially romance – "I think I picked up the best information from romance." This was especially true for Final Jeopardy!. As she related in an interview, "So the Final Jeopardy! category was English Monarchs, and I had to place my bet before I knew the answer. I had $6,400 at the time. I bet $6,200 because I had a strong feeling after my own history with historical romance, I would know this one. The answer was, 'The name of two kings, fifth and eighth, who were notable for being king but not crowned.' (Cue music.) And yes, I knew that the two kings, one of the boys Richard III allegedly killed in the Tower, and the king who abdicated for Wallace Simpson, were named Edward. I didn't win. Unfortunately, the other two players knew it, too. But I knew the answer. And I knew it because I read and write historical romance."

Bibliography

As Eileen Dreyer

Drake's Rakes 
1. 
2. 
3. 
3.5. 
4. 
5.

Molly Burke

Stand-alone works

Anthologies
  in Phyllis A. Whitney Presents Malice Domestic 5
  in Mothers and Sons

As Kathleen Korbel

Daughters of Myth 
Paranormal Romance

Stand-alone works

Anthologies and short stories
  in Silhouette Summer Sizzlers
  in Silhouette Shadows '93

Awards and reception

 1987 - RT Bookclub named her Best New Contemporary Romance Author
 1989 - Romantic Times Reviewers' Choice Award for Best Silhouette Desire for Hotshot
 1990 – Romance Writers of America RITA Award for Best Long Contemporary Series for The Ice Cream Man
 1990 – Romance Writers of America RITA Award for Best Romantic Suspense for Perchance to Dream
 1992 – Romance Writers of America RITA Award for Best Single Title Contemporary for A Man to Die For
 1992 – Romance Writers of America RITA Award for Best Long Contemporary Series Romance for A Rose for Maggie
 1993 – Romantic Times Reviewers' Choice Award for Best Series Romance Book of the Year for A Walk on the Wild Side
 1995 – Romance Writers of America RITA Award for Best Long Contemporary Series Romance for A Soldier's Heart
 1996 – Anthony Award Nominee for Best Paperback Original for Bad Medicine
 2003 – Romantic Times Reviewers' Choice Award for Best Silhouette Intimate Moments for Some Men's Dreams
 2003 – Romance Readers Anonymous (RRA) Award for Some Men's Dreams
 2005 – Romantic Times Career Achievement Award Winner – Suspense
 2010 – Romantic Times Reviewers' Choice Award for Best Historical for Barely a Lady

References

External links
 Official website

Living people
21st-century American novelists
20th-century American novelists
American women novelists
American romantic fiction writers
RITA Award winners
21st-century American women writers
20th-century American women writers
Jeopardy! contestants
Novelists from Missouri
Year of birth missing (living people)
Women romantic fiction writers